Ulmus bergmanniana var. lasiophylla C. K. Schneid. is endemic to China, on mountain slopes at elevations of 2100–2900 m in Gansu, Shaanxi, north-west Sichuan, south-east Xizang (formerly Tibet), and north-west Yunnan.

Description
The tree is distinguished by Fu (2002) as having "Leaf blade adaxially with densely curved pubescence.  Flowers and fruits February - April".

Cultivation
Var. lasiophylla is cold hardy; in artificial freezing tests at the Morton Arboretum the LT50 (temp. at which 50% of tissues die) was found to be - 27.7 °C. There are no known cultivars of this taxon, nor is it known to be in commerce.

Accessions

North America
Chicago Botanic Garden, US. No accession details; planted in West Collections Area.
Morton Arboretum, US. Acc. no. 45–95. Collected from the wild at an unrecorded site in China.
United States National Arboretum, Washington, D.C., US. Acc. nos. 76218, 68978.

Europe
Grange Farm Arboretum , Lincolnshire, UK. Acc. no. 1057. 
Royal Botanic Garden Edinburgh, UK. Acc. no. 19933397. Wild collected in Kunming, China, by Gothenburg Expedition.

References

External links

Elm species and varieties
Trees of China
Flora of China
Trees of Asia
Ulmus articles missing images
bergmanniana var. lasiophylla